Jorge Herrera Delgado (16 August 1961 – 24 November 2014) was a Mexican politician. A graduate in industrial engineering from the Durango Institute of Technology (ITD), he was a member of the Institutional Revolutionary Party. He founded the radio station XHITD-FM Estéreo Tecnológico in Durango. He was Mayor of Durango from 2004-2007 and a two-time deputy in the Durango state congress. He was designated by Governor Jorge Herrera Caldera to head the Durango Department of Education from 15 September 2010 to 7 February 2012.

He was elected to represent the fourth district of Durango in the LXII Legislature of the Mexican Congress (2012-2015). He belonged to following legislative commissions:   Urban Development and Territorial Regulation (President), Treasury and Public Expenditure (Secretary), Public Education and Educative Service.

From 15 April, he was a delegate on the Executive National Committee of the PRI in Sonora.

Delgado died on 24 November 2014 from pancreatic cancer at the age of 53. He was replaced by his alternate deputy, Eduardo Solís Nogueira.

Prizes
First Prize of Information Access in the category to Government Employees by Konrad-Adenaur Stiftung (KAS) Foundation and Libertad de Información, A. C. (LIMAC) in 2005.

References

1961 births
2014 deaths
Politicians from Durango
People from Durango City
Members of the Chamber of Deputies (Mexico) for Durango
Institutional Revolutionary Party politicians
Deaths from cancer in Mexico
Deaths from pancreatic cancer
21st-century Mexican politicians
Members of the Congress of Durango
Municipal presidents in Durango
Durango Institute of Technology alumni
Deputies of the LXII Legislature of Mexico